Sudan is still one of the largest countries in Africa even after the split of the Northern and Southern parts. It is one of the most densely populated countries in the region and is home to over 37.9 million people. 

Sudan is a young population country with the median age 19.6 years. The total life expectancy for male and female at birth was estimated around 62 and 66 years respectively, and this is considered the average of least developed countries. The under-five child mortality rate was 77/1000 in 2015 compared to 128/1000 in 1990 and the maternal mortality ratio was 360/100,000 in 2015 compared to 720/100,000 in 1990.

Sudan has a high incidence of debilitating and sometimes fatal diseases, the persistence of which reflects difficult ecological conditions, high levels of malnutrition, an inadequate health-care system, and conflict and violence. Sudan is also susceptible to non-communicable diseases, natural and manmade disasters. Drought, flood, internal conflicts, and outbreaks of violence are quite common which bring about a burden of traumatic disease and demand for high quality emergency health care.

Situation

History of health care in Sudan 
History of the medical research and providing professional medical health care in Sudan could be traced back to 1903, when The Wellcome Research Laboratory was established in Khartoum as a part  of the Gordon Memorial College.

The reorganization of the services dealing with scientific research in the Sudan in April 1935 made the Stack Medical Research Laboratories the official research organ of the Sudan Medical Service, and Dr. E. S. Horgan-Archibald's successor-was appointed Director to the laboratories and Assistant Director (Research) Sudan Medical Service. The Wellcome Tropical Research Laboratories ceased to exist as such, but thereafter continued to operate as the Wellcome Chemical Laboratories; and after being placed under the control of the Agricultural Research Service for the following four years, they were transferred back to the Sudan Medical Service in 1939.

Recent health situation 
Sudan, with an increasingly ageing population, faces a double burden of disease with rising rates of communicable and noncommunicable diseases. 
 The Sudan Household Survey 2010 showed that 26.8% of children aged 5 to 59 months had diarrhea, while 18.7% were sick due to suspected pneumonia in the two weeks before the survey was done. 
 Protein energy malnutrition and micronutrient deficiencies continue to be a major problem among children under 5, with 12.6% and 15.7% suffering from severe wasting and stunting, respectively. The most common micronutrient deficiencies are iodine, iron and vitamin A.
 Concerning the MDGs, still 73 [range: 59–88] (Both sexes) out of every 1000 children born do not live to see their fifth birthday. The Maternal mortality ratio per 100 000 live births estimated at 730 [380–1400] deaths per 100 000 live births in 2010. 
 The MDG target for malaria has been achieved, although it remains to be a major health problem. In 2010, malaria led to the death of 23 persons in every 100 000 population; while in total over 1.6 million cases were reported. 
 The annual incidence of new TB cases for 2010 is 119 per 100 000, half of them smear-positive. TB case-detection rate of 35% is well below the target of 70%, but treatment success rate at 82% is close to the WHO target of 85%. With respect to HIV-AIDS, the epidemic is classified as low among the general population estimated prevalence rate of 0.24% with concentrated epidemic in two states.
Water is a main cause to each of these.

Vital statistics 
The vital statistics below include South Sudan.

Life expectancy

Source: UN World Population Prospects

Health policies, systems and financing 
The socioeconomics of Sudan were deteriorating after the separation of South Sudan, while there is still conflict in Darfur, South Kordofan and Blue Nile states. Sudan’s economy has suffered a great deal from this. Firstly from a fall in oil prices and more recently from the loss of revenue from South Sudan for oil transportation. In addition, there are continuing sanctions and a trade embargo. Due to these occurrences, funds for health have been cut, adding to the fragility of the health sector. In the past, the health financing system in Sudan has undergone several changes, from a tax-based system in the late 1950s to the introduction of user fees along with social solidarity schemes such as the Takaful system. The social health insurance scheme was implemented in 1995, alongside which the private sector grew exponentially leading to increased out-of-pocket from households In 2006, free emergency care for the first 24 hours was announced free of charge, and the free finance policy for children under 5 and pregnant women was adopted in 2008. Sudan has also reviewed health system financing using the OASIS approach as a prelude to framing its national strategy for health financing. Also, the country has embarked on developing detailed roadmap for providing universal health coverage to its population.

Health services in Sudan are provided by the Federal and State Ministries of Heath, military medical services, police, universities, and private sector. The districts or localities which are the closest to people are mainly pro Policies and plans in Sudan are produced at three levels federal, state, and district (also called locality) providing primary health care, health promotion, and encouraging community participation in caring for their health and surrounding environment. They are responsible for water and sanitation services as well. This well-established district system is a key component of the decentralization approach pursued in Sudan which gives in turn a broader space for local management, administration and allow for overcoming the leadership and supervision efforts by superior bodies.

There is one Federal Ministry of Health (FMOH) and 18 State Ministries of Health (SMOH). The federal level is responsible for provision of nation-wide health policies, plans, strategies, overall monitoring and evaluation, coordination, training, and external relations. The state level is concerned with state's plans, strategies, and based on federal guidelines funding and implementation of plans. While the localities are mainly concerned with implementation and service delivery.

Federal Ministry of Health, Ministry of Veterinary and Animal Resources, and Agriculture and Corps Ministry are members of what is called the Public Health Council which is the main national legislative body providing regulatory instructions particularly those regarding zoonotic diseases. A major product of this council is the Public Health Act of 1975. Nevertheless, states and localities are empowered to set their own regulations and laws based on their needs. Additional regulatory bodies are available including the medical council and the allied health council which are in charge for doctors and health provider's certification and licensing.

Health Service Delivery 
The health services provided in Sudan follow the classical three basic arrangements, primary, secondary, tertiary health care. The primary health care is the first encounter for the patients and includes as mentioned in the organizations the dressing stations, dispensaries, primary health care units and health centers, the latter forms the referral point from the lower facilities. The importance of PHC is that it provides the essential care to all and improves the health status of the community as a whole. In 2003 a package of health care services was introduced to the PHC facilities. This package included vaccination of children, nutrition, reproductive health (RH), integrated management of childhood immunization (IMCI), management of common diseases and prescribing the essential medications. This line of care is almost entirely provided by the public sector.

On the other hand, both public and private sectors work together in the provision of the secondary and tertiary lines of care. Though, the private sectors has been functioning mainly in urban areas. Screening, diagnostic, and therapeutic services are being provided in both health centers and hospitals as secondary care, where major surgical, rehabilitative, and subspecialized tertiary care is being provided mainly at larger public hospitals including teaching hospital, private hospitals, and in specialized centers. These hospitals and centers accepts patients without being referred from the lower facilities indicating a poor referral system.

In the last decade, the number of hospitals has been an increasing trend and it continues to be. It is agreed that a core component of primary health care is health promotion which is limited in Sudan while health problems suitable for health awareness campaigns are present including the enormous communicable diseases, malnutrition, and even the non-communicable diseases. Furthermore, in regard to the services provided at the PHC, these services are not achieving optimum utilization rates. For example, only 81.6% of PHC units provide vaccination for children and 67.3% provide family planning services. Although these numbers are improving in comparison to the past, they are not ideal and further emphasis on coverage, availability, and accessibility is required. Another notifiable weakness regarding PHC, is that unlike the secondary and tertiary services that are increasing in number, PHC units are decreasing either due to cessation of function or in comparison to the population growth.

Regional disparities 
It is difficult to generalize about health care in Sudan because of the great disparity between the major urban areas and the rest of the country. Indeed, the availability of health care in urban settings is one cause of rural to urban migration. In terms of access to health care, Sudan can be subdivided into three categories: distinctly rural, rural near urban areas, and the capital region. In rural areas, especially outlying provinces, standard health care is completely absent. For the most part, there are neither doctors nor clinics in these regions. When illness occurs, home remedies and rest are often the only potential “treatments” available, along with a visit to a faqih or to a sorcerer, depending on region and location. Rural areas near cities or with access to bus or rail lines are slightly more fortunate. Small primary-care units staffed by knowledgeable, if not fully certified, health workers dispense rudimentary care and advice and also issue referrals to proper clinics in urban areas. Provincial capitals have doctors and hospitals but in insufficient numbers and of insufficient quality to meet rising demand. 

The Three Towns of the capital region boast the best medical facilities and doctors in the country, although many of these would still be considered substandard in other parts of the world. Here, health care is available in three types of facilities: the overcrowded, poorly maintained, and underequipped government hospitals; private clinics with adequate facilities and equipment, often operated by foreign-educated doctors and charging prices affordable only by the middle and upper classes; and public clinics run by Islamist da’wa (religiously based charities) or by Christian missionaries, where adequate health care is available for a nominal fee. Not surprisingly, many patients flock to the third category where it is available.

WHO maintained offices in the capitals of each of Darfur’s three states in 2005 and oversaw the effort to provide health services there. More than 13,000 national and international personnel were involved in providing food, clean water, sanitation, primary health care, and medical drugs to the region’s refugees. In 2006, some 2.5 million Darfuri were in need of assistance, and an estimated 22 percent of children suffered from acute malnutrition. One researcher reported that, as of 2011, reliable information on Eastern Sudan was scarce, but overall health conditions could be gauged from under-five child mortality rates per 1,000 live births. In 2005 WHO reported that these ranged from 117 in Al-Gedaref State, to 165 in Red Sea, to 172 in Blue Nile, all high even by standards of comparable developing countries.

Communicable diseases
Poor sanitation and inadequate health care explain the presence of many communicable diseases in Sudan. Acute respiratory infections, hepatitis E, measles, meningitis, typhoid, and tuberculosis are all major causes of illness and mortality. More restricted geographically but affecting substantial portions of the population in the areas of occurrence is schistosomiasis (snail fever), found in the White Nile and Blue Nile areas and in irrigated zones between the two Niles.

Malaria
Malaria is the leading cause of morbidity and mortality in Sudan, and the entire population is at risk. It commands an inordinate amount of Sudan’s limited medical expertise. In 2003 hospitals reported 3 million cases; malaria victims accounted for up to 40 percent of outpatient consultations and 30 percent of all hospital admissions. In Darfur alone in 2005, doctors reported 227,550 cases; doctors, however, did report greater success in saving patients than in past years. In 2007 a study was conducted in Sudan which revealed underreporting of malaria episodes and deaths to the formal health system, with the consequent underestimation of the disease burden.

Children less than five years of age had the highest mortality rate and DALYs, emphasizing the known effect of malaria on this population group. Females lost more DALYs than males in all age groups, which altered the picture displayed by the incidence rates alone. The epidemiological estimates and DALYs calculations in this study form a basis for comparing interventions that affect mortality and morbidity differently, by comparing the amount of burden averted by them. The DALYs would mark the position of malaria among the rest of the diseases, if compared to DALYs due to other diseases. Uncertainty around the estimates should be considered when using them for decision making and further work should quantify this uncertainty to facilitate utilisation of the results. More epidemiological studies are required to fill in the gaps revealed in this study and to more accurately determine the effect and burden of the disease.

Diarrhea
A lack of safe water means that nearly 45 percent of children suffer from diarrhea, which leads to poor health and weak immune systems.

Yellow fever
The World Health Organization was notified by the Federal Ministry of Health of Sudan of an outbreak of yellow fever in 2012 which affected five states in Darfur. The yellow fever outbreak resulted in 847 suspected cases including 171 deaths. To reduce the spread of yellow fever, The World Health Organization worked with The Federal Ministry of Health in Sudan on a vaccination campaign that halted the outbreak.

HIV/AIDS

Sudan is considered to be a country with an intermediate HIV and AIDS prevalence by the World Health Organization (WHO).

The main mode of transmission worldwide is through heterosexual contact, which is no different in Sudan. In Sudan, heterosexual transmission accounted for 97% of HIV positive cases. As of January 5, 2011, the Adult(15-49) prevalence in Sudan was found to be 0.4%, an estimated 260,000 were living with HIV and there were 12,000 HIV related annual deaths. A population based study was conducted in 2002 which estimated the sero-prevalence to be 1.6%. According to recent studies, the HIV and  AIDS prevalence in Sudan among blood donors has increased from 0.15% in 1993 to 1.4% in 2000.

Polio
Sudan has been polio-free since 2009 but is vulnerable to transmission from refugees from high-risk countries.  A polio vaccination campaign was launched in 2018, supported by the World Health Organization.  5 million doses have been provided.

Non-communicable diseases

Sickle cell disease 
In Sudan, sickle cell disease was first reported in 1926 by Archibald. The disease is considered one of the major types of anemia especially in western Sudan where the sickle cell gene is frequent  Sickle cell disease is the major haemoglobinopathy seen in the Khartoum, the capital of Sudan. This may be attributed to the migration of tribes from western Sudan as a result of drought and desertification in the 1970s and 1980s, and the conflicts in Darfur in 2005. The rate is higher in Western Sudanese ethnic groups particularly in Messeryia tribes in Darfur and Kordofan regions.

Cardiovascular disease 
The Federal Ministry of Health issues an annual health statistical report that includes data on causes of hospital mortality. Over the past decade, cardiovascular disease has been consistently reported in the top 10 causes of hospital mortality, with malaria and acute respiratory infections as the first two causes.

The SHHS reported a prevalence of 2.5% for heart disease. Hypertensive heart disease (HHD), rheumatic heart disease (RHD), ischaemic heart disease (IHD) and cardiomyopathy constitute more than 80% of CVD in Sudan. Hypertension (HTN) had a prevalence of 20.1 and 20.4% in the SHHS and STEPS survey, respectively. There were poor control rates and a high prevalence of target-organ damage in the local studies. RHD prevalence data were available only for Khartoum state and the incidence has dropped from 3/1 000 people in the 1980s to 0.3% in 2003. There were no data on any other states. The coronary event rates in 1989 were 112/100 000 people, with a total mortality of 36/100 000. Prevalence rates of low physical activity, obesity, HTN, hypercholesterolaemia, diabetes and smoking were 86.8, 53.9, 23.6, 19.8, 19.2 and 12%, respectively, in the STEPS survey. Peripartum cardiomyopathy occurs at a rate of 1.5% of all deliveries. Congenital heart disease is prevalent in 0.2% of children.

Diabetes 
In Sudan, the national prevalence of diabetes in adults is 7.7% and is expected to reach 10.8% in 2035. There were  over 2.247.000 cases of diabetes in Sudan in 2017.

Levels and trends in under-5 and infant mortality

In Sudan, under-five mortality declined by 43 percent (on average, 1.5 percentage points per year) between 1965 and 2008 - from 157 to 89 deaths per 1000 live births. Improvements in under-five mortality  during this period were driven primarily by reductions in child mortality (deaths among children aged 1–5). Progress in reducing infant mortality was slower by contrast – falling from 86 to 59 infant deaths per 1000 live births – at a rate of 0.7 percent per year.
Under-five mortality levels for Sudan are 30 percent lower than the average for Africa and 51 percent higher than the global average. Sudan’s under-five mortality rate is at the average for low-middle income  countries
 Mortality among children is heavily concentrated during their first year. An estimated 65 percent of deaths occurring before the age of five, happen during infancy (before children reach one year of age) and  approximately 33 percent of deaths occurring before the age of five happen during the neonatal period (in the first 30 days after birth).

Maternal health

Complications during pregnancy affect one three pregnant women and complications during labor or up to six weeks after delivery affect one in two pregnant women. Close to 50 percent of female deaths occurs  during pregnancy, delivery or two months after delivery. In this high risk setting, access to a continuum of effective antenatal, intrapartum and post-partum care for pregnant women is critical.
In 2010, evidence-based maternal survival interventions (including professional antenatal and delivery care) covered 40 percent of women in need. (up from 35 percent in 2006).
Family planning and effective ante-natal care are among the maternal survival interventions with the lowest population coverage: In 2010, 11 percent of married or cohabiting women used some form of  contraception. Unmet demand for contraception is particularly large among cohorts of women older than  30 years of age.
Between 2008 and 2010, while 73 percent of pregnant women reported attending at least one antenatal check-up, only 14 percent of pregnant women reported obtaining an effective package of antenatal  services including four antenatal care visits, an assessment for blood pressure, urine screen for protein, a  blood screen for anemia and two doses of tetanus toxoid vaccine.
Between 2008 and 2010, among women of reproductive age with a pregnancy, 73 percent of all births were delivered with the support of a skilled professional (births attended by a doctor, nurse midwife or village midwife) - up from 63 percent between 2004 and 2006. This increase in coverage was driven by an  increase in the proportion of births delivered by auxiliary or village midwives. The gains in professional  support during childbirth have benefitted women in rural and urban areas alike.
As 75 percent of women reside in rural areas and births primarily occur in the home (in 2010, 75 percent of births occurred in the home), a significant challenge in this setting is to ensure women have access to emergency obstetric care if needed. Emergency care requires the availability of unscheduled 24 hour services close to the home. In Sudan, only one in five women delivers in a facility. Expanding the availability

Oral health in Sudan 
Little data is found in literature about the oral health in Sudan before the 1960s. Studies conducted after that showed different results because they were carried out in different populations and clinical settings.

About 772 dentists are practicing in Sudan (2 dentists/ 100 000 ) in 2008. Dental services are included in insurance schemes with the exception of dentures, orthodontic treatments and plastic surgery.

Dental caries

Decay-missing-filled index 
The decay-missing-filled index are indicators used to determine the status of dental caries. The table below is from a 1993 report reporting on such data.

* A total of 275 pre-school children in
kindergartens from Khartoum were studied.

Periodontal disease

Cleft lip and palate 
This malformation showed a prevalence of 0.9 per 1000 in Sudan. More girls are affected than boys, with a male:female ratio of 3:10. (44% cleft lip with cleft palate, 30% only cleft palate, and 16% cleft lip alone).

References

External links
 World Health Organization (WHO): Sudan
 The State of the World's Midwifery - Sudan Country Profile